Cecil William Edward U'ren (9 November 1903 — 29 May 1971) was an English first-class cricketer and an officer in the Indian Imperial Police.

U'ren was born at Devonport in November 1903. U'ren joined the Indian Imperial Police in British India as an assistant superintendent in Bombay in December 1924, remaining in this rank until February 1932, when he became officiating superintendent. He was appointed officiating deputy commander of police in Bombay in February 1936, and was conferred the rank of superintendent in October 1939. U'ren was awarded the Indian Police Medal in 1941, before being appointed deputy commander of Special Branch in India. While in British India, he played first-class cricket for the Europeans cricket team on two occasions in the Bombay Pentangular against the Parsees in 1941 and the Hindus in 1943. He scored 14 runs in his two matches, with a highest score of 10 not out, while with his bowling he took a single wicket. U'Ren was awarded the King's Police Medal in the 1947 Birthday Honours, in recognition of distinguished service. He later returned to England, where he died at Sutton in May 1971.

References

External links

1903 births
1971 deaths
Sportspeople from Devonport, Plymouth
Indian Police Service officers in British India
English cricketers
Europeans cricketers